West Lynn may refer to:

 West Lynn, Norfolk, part of King's Lynn, Norfolk, England
 West Lynn, Devon, England
 West Lynn, Massachusetts
 West Lynn Township, McLeod County, Minnesota

See also
West Linn, Oregon